Martin Krnáč (born 30 January 1985) is a Slovak retired footballer who and current goalkeeper coach of SC Kittsee.

He was second-choice goalkeeper behind Martin Dúbravka for MSK's games in the 2010-11 UEFA Champions League.

Career

Club career
In January 2020, Krnáč, who also is running a goalkeeper school in Bratislava, joined Austrian club SC Kittsee as a goalkeeper coach. He was also on the bench for one league game in October 2020.

References

External links
 
 
 
 Eurofotbal profile

1985 births
Living people
Slovak footballers
Slovak expatriate footballers
Association football goalkeepers
FK Inter Bratislava players
FK Senica players
MŠK Žilina players
ŠK Slovan Bratislava players
MFK Skalica players
Mezőkövesdi SE footballers
MFK Karviná players
FC ViOn Zlaté Moravce players
Slovak Super Liga players
2. Liga (Slovakia) players
Slovak expatriate sportspeople in Hungary
Slovak expatriate sportspeople in the Czech Republic
Slovak expatriate sportspeople in Austria
Expatriate footballers in Hungary
Expatriate footballers in the Czech Republic
Expatriate footballers in Austria